Prumnopitys harmsiana (ulcumano; syn. Podocarpus harmsianus Pilg.) is a species of Prumnopitys, native to the Andes in Bolivia, Colombia, Peru, and Venezuela. It is in the family Podocarpaceae, and an IUCN Near Threatened species.

Description
Prumnopitys harmsiana is a medium-sized tree similar to Prumnopitys andina. The leaves are 2–3 cm long and 2–3 mm broad, with a short spine tip.

The cones are highly modified, bearing a few drupe-like seeds, each seed with a thin fleshy coat.

References

 Dallimore, W., & Jackson, A. B. (1966). A Handbook of Coniferae and Ginkgoaceae, 4th ed. Arnold, London.

harmsiana
Flora of the Andes
Near threatened plants
Trees of Bolivia
Trees of Colombia
Trees of Peru
Trees of Venezuela
Taxonomy articles created by Polbot